Pavy may refer to:

People with the surname
Amery of Pavy, 14th-century English knight.
Béatrice Pavy (born 1958), French politician.
Felix Octave Pavy (1879-1962), American politician.
Frederick William Pavy (1829-1911), British physician.
Francis X. Pavy (born 1954), American painter and sculptor.
Louis-Antoine-Augustin Pavy (1805-1866), Bishop of Algiers from 1846 to 1866.

Other
Pavy Formation, geologic formation in Canada.